Jariban is a town in the north-central Mudug region of Somalia. It is the center of the Jariban District. It is administered by Puntland.

Demographics
Jariban has a population of approximately 20,000 inhabitants. The Jariban District has a total population of 39,207 residents.

Services
In October 2014, the Puntland government in conjunction with the local Kaalo NGO and UN-HABITAT launched a new regional census to gather basic information in order to facilitate social service planning and development, as well as tax collection in remote areas. According to senior Puntland officials, a similar survey was already carried out in towns near the principal Garowe–Bosaso Highway. The new census initiative is slated to begin in the Jariban District, Bayla District and Eyl Districts.

Education
Jariban has a number of academic institutions. According to the Puntland Ministry of Education, there are 7 primary schools in the Jariban District. Among these are Sallax, Labilamane, Kulub and Jariban Primary. Secondary schools in the area include Jariban Secondary.

Transportation
In 2012, the Puntland Highway Authority (PHA) announced a project to connect Jariban and other littoral towns in Puntland to the main regional highway. The 750 km thoroughfare links major cities in the northern part of Somalia, such as Bosaso, Galkayo and Garowe, with towns in the south.

Notes

References
Jariban

Populated places in Mudug